SPH Media Trust (SMT), commonly known as SPH Media, is a media organisation with businesses in print, digital, radio, and outdoor media in Singapore. Legally a company limited by guarantee, it was incorporated on 19 July 2021, and began establishment operation on 1 December 2021 after Singapore Press Holdings completed the transfer of its media business. 

It forms part of a duopoly of the mass media in the country, alongside Mediacorp. SPH Media Trust has over 2,500 employees, including a team of approximately 1,000 journalists, including correspondents operating around the world.

History

Singapore Press Holdings Limited (SPH) was formed on 4 August 1984 through a merger of three organisations, The Straits Times Press Group, Singapore News and Publications Limited and Times Publishing Berhad.

SPH readership has stagnated since the early-2000s, as Singaporeans increasingly turned to online media for their news consumption.

On 6 May 2021, SPH in response to shareholder pressures, had proposed that it would restructure itself and transfer its media business into a company limited by guarantee (CLG), which will be privately managed. The new CLG would initially be managed by the holders of SPH's management shareholders at the time, while still having to issue new management shares of the media business under the CLG as required by Newspaper and Printing Presses Act. The government would also lift the shareholder limits on the currently listed SPH entity. This new CLG was named SPH Media Trust.

On 10 September 2021, an extraordinary general meeting was convened over the restructuring proposal to transfer all media business-related assets and staff to SMT. Approximately 97.55% of the 300 shareholders voted in favour of the proposal. The transfer was completed on 1 December 2021. The assets transferred included its headquarters, News Center, and its press, Print Center, as well as all intellectual property and information technology assets. Along with the assets transfer, 2,500 staff were transferred to SMT as well.

As part of its restructuring, it transited The New Paper into a fully digital publication and ceased to be a print publication on 11 December 2021. Additionally, it folded Lianhe Wanbao (联合晚报) into Shin Min Daily News (新明日报) on 24 December 2021, consolidating its resources to produce only one Chinese evening paper while taking into account of the limited number of local talents in the Chinese media and shrinking market.

A review of internal processes of SMT was started in March 2022 which included the reporting of circulation data. In January 2023, it was reported that daily circulation numbers of SPH's publications, including broadsheets The Straits Times and Lianhe Zaobao, were inflated by 10 to 12 percent. The figures were inflated due to double counting of subscriptions, a project account which was funded to purchase fictitious circulation and arbitrarily derived circulation numbers.

Ownership

As a private company, SPH Media Trust is managed privately by its shareholders. The initial shareholders were made up of the management shareholders of Singapore Press Holdings, as SPH was a newspaper company as defined under  the Newspaper and Printing Presses Act (NPPA) of 1974. The management shares are regulated through NPPA and its issuance and transfers have to be approved by the Ministry of Communications and Information, and in "any resolution relating to the appointment or dismissal of a director or any member of the staff" the vote of one management share is equivalent to 200 ordinary shares.

New management shares are to be issued to the individual media businesses under SMT.

The institutional members of SMT are:
DBS Bank
United Overseas Bank
OCBC Bank
Great Eastern Life
Singtel
CapitaLand
Changi Airport Group
PSA International
Mapletree Investments
Fullerton Limited
Income Insurance
NTUC Enterprise Co-Operative
National University of Singapore
Nanyang Technological University
Singapore Management University
Singapore University of Technology and Design

Newspapers 
In Singapore, SMT publishes 8 newspaper titles in four languages.

English 
The Business Times (Saturday edition: The Business Times Weekend)
The New Paper
The Straits Times (Sunday edition: The Sunday Times)
tabla! – free English language newspaper for the Indian community; 30,000 copies distributed each Friday at 7-Eleven outlets

Chinese 
Lianhe Zaobao (联合早报) (Sunday edition: zbSunday)
Shin Min Daily News (新明日报)

Malay 
Berita Harian (Sunday edition: Berita Minggu)

Tamil 
Tamil Murasu (தமிழ் முரசு)

Magazines 
SMT publishes and produces 10 magazine titles in Singapore and the region, covering a range of interests from lifestyle to information technology.

Female
HWM
HardwareZone
Harper's Bazaar Singapore
Her World
Home & Decor
ICON
Nüyou
The Peak
Singapore Women's Weekly

Book publishing 
SMT's subsidiary Straits Times Press produces books and periodicals in English and Chinese.

Digital 
Beyond print, the digital editions of SMT newspapers enjoy over 360 million page views with 23 million unique visitors every month. Apart from AsiaOne, SMT's online and new media initiatives include STOMP, online journalism web portal; STJobs and STProperty, online portal for jobs and property; and STClassifieds for general classified ads.

In 2018, SPH sold a 51% stake in AsiaOne to mm2 Asia.

Radio 
SMT manages and operates five radio stations: 96.3 Hao FM and UFM100.3 in Mandarin, as well as MONEY FM 89.3, Kiss92 FM and ONE FM 91.3 in English.

MONEY FM 89.3 targets educated English speakers aged 35 years and above who take an interest in everyday personal finance matters. ONE FM 91.3 is an English music station playing all the greatest hits from the 80s’ to now. Kiss92 FM targets modern, driven and savvy women aged between 30 and 50, providing informative content and adult contemporary music from the 90's to current. 96.3 Hao FM (96.3好FM) targets bilingual Singaporeans aged 45 years and above. UFM100.3 targets working professionals aged between 35 and 49 years.

Outdoor advertising 
SMT has ventured into outdoor advertising through its digital out-of-home platform SPHMBO.

References

External links

SPH Media Solutions

 
2021 establishments in Singapore
Publishing companies established in 2021
Mass media companies established in 2021
Mass media companies of Singapore
Newspaper companies of Singapore
Singaporean brands